State Route 202 (SR 202) is a state highway in the U.S. state of California that serves as a spur route from State Route 58 in Tehachapi in Kern County to the California Correctional Institution.

A portion of SR 202 is overlapped with SR 58 Business. That portion follows the alignment of decommissioned U.S. Route 466.

Route description
The road begins with its western terminus at the California Correctional Institution in Cummings Valley along West Valley Boulevard, its name for part of the route. SR 202 then heads eastward through a farmland area before entering a suburb area of Tehachapi. The road then abruptly turns north toward SR 58 Business where it is concurrent with the business route through town to its eastern end at State Route 58 with an interchange.

SR 202 is part of the National Highway System, a network of highways that are considered essential to the country's economy, defense, and mobility by the Federal Highway Administration.

Major intersections

See also

References

External links

California @ AARoads.com - State Route 202
Caltrans: Route 202 highway conditions
California Highways: SR 202

202
State Route 202
Tehachapi, California